Jiří Jelínek (born 1977) is a Czech ballet dancer. He was a principal dancer with the National Theatre Ballet (Prague) and the Stuttgart Ballet. He joined the National Ballet of Canada as a principal dancer in January 2010. He is known for his combination of a powerful stage presence and his partnering skills. The Czech dancer is particularly renowned for his portrayal of Onegin in John Cranko's Onegin. He has danced with many ballerinas including Polina Semionova, Sue Jin Kang, Bridget Breiner, Alicia Amatriain, Katia Wunsche, Xiao Nan Yu, Sonia Rodriguez, Heather Ogden, Tatiana Juricova, Jayne Smeulders, and Ljubov Andreeva.

References

External links
 Portrait in the Archive of the National Theatre Prague

1977 births
Living people
Czech male ballet dancers
Dancers from Prague